The First Lady of American Samoa is the title attributed to the wife of the governor of American Samoa. To date, there have been no first gentlemen of American Samoa.

The current first lady is Ella Mauga, wife of Governor Lemanu Peleti Mauga, who has held the position since January 3, 2021.

List of first ladies of American Samoa

First ladies of Naval governors (1900–1951)

First ladies of Civilian governors (1951–1978)

First ladies of elected governors (1978–present)

See also 
 List of governors of American Samoa

References

 
American Samoan women in politics